Hypostomus ternetzi is a species of catfish in the family Loricariidae. It is native to South America, where it occurs in the basins of the Paraná River, the Paraguay River, and the Uruguay River. The species reaches 34.3 cm (13.5 inches) in total length and is believed to be a facultative air-breather. It is known to spawn by excavating nests in stream banks in which eggs are deposited.

References 

ternetzi
Fish of South America
Fish described in 1895